2023 Four Continents Speed Skating Championships was the third edition of the Four Continents Speed Skating Championships. The event was held in Quebec, Canada.

Results

Men's events

Women's events

Medal table

References

External links
Results

2023
2022 in speed skating
2022 in Canadian sports
Sports competitions in Quebec
International speed skating competitions hosted by Canada
December 2022 sports events in Canada